In carbohydrate chemistry, a pair of anomers is a pair of near-identical stereoisomers or diastereomers that differ at only the anomeric carbon, the carbon that bears the aldehyde or ketone functional group in the sugar's open-chain form. However, in order for anomers to exist, the sugar must be in its cyclic form, since in open-chain form, the anomeric carbon is planar and thus achiral. More formally stated, then, an anomer is an epimer at the hemiacetal/hemiketal carbon in a cyclic saccharide. Anomerization is the process of conversion of one anomer to the other. As is typical for stereoisomeric compounds, different anomers have different physical properties, melting points and specific rotations.

Nomenclature

Two anomers are designated alpha (α) or beta (β), according to the configurational relationship between the anomeric centre and the anomeric reference atom, hence they are relative stereodescriptors. The anomeric centre in hemiacetals is the anomeric carbon C-1; in hemiketals, it is the carbon derived from the carbonyl of the ketone (e.g. C-2 in D-fructose). In aldohexoses the anomeric reference atom is the stereocenter that is farthest from anomeric carbon in the ring (the configurational atom, defining the sugar as D or L). For example, in α-D-glucopyranose the reference atom is C-5.

If in the cyclic Fischer projection the exocyclic oxygen atom at the anomeric centre is cis (on the same side) to the exocyclic oxygen attached to the anomeric reference atom (in the OH group) the anomer is α. If the two oxygens are trans (on different sides) the anomer is β. Thus, the absolute configurations of the anomeric carbon and the reference atom are the same (both R or both S) in the α anomer and opposite (one R and the other S) in the β anomer.

Anomerization
Anomerization is the process of conversion of one anomer to the other. For reducing sugars, anomerization is referred to as mutarotation and occurs readily in solution and is catalyzed by acid and base. This reversible process typically leads to an anomeric mixture in which eventually an equilibrium is reached between the two single anomers.

The ratio of the two anomers is specific for the regarding sugar. For example, regardless of the configuration of the starting D-glucose, a solution will gradually move towards being a mixture of approximately 64% β-D-glucopyranoside and 36% of α-D-glucopyranose. As the ratio changes, the optical rotation of the mixture changes; this phenomenon is called mutarotation.

Mechanism of anomerization 

Though the cyclic forms of sugars are usually heavily favoured, hemiacetals in aqueous solution are in equilibrium with their open-chain forms. In aldohexoses this equilibrium is established as the hemiacetal bond between C-1 (the carbon bound to two oxygens) and C-5 oxygen is cleaved (forming the open-chain compound) and reformed (forming the cyclic compound). When the hemiacetal group is reformed, the OH group on C-5 may attack either of the two stereochemically distinct sides of the aldehyde group on C-1.  Which side it attacks on determines whether the α- or β-anomer is formed.

Anomerization of glycosides typically occurs under acidic conditions. Typically, anomerization occurs through protonation of the exocyclic acetal oxygen, ionization to form an oxocarbenium ion with release of an alcohol, and nucleophilic attack by an alcohol on the reverse face of the oxocarbenium ion, followed by deprotonation.

Physical properties and stability
Anomers are different in structure, and thus have different stabilizing and destabilizing effects from each other. The major contributors to the stability of a certain anomer are:
The anomeric effect, which stabilizes the anomer that has an electron withdrawing group (typically an oxygen or nitrogen atom) in axial orientation on the ring. This effect is abolished in polar solvents such as water.
1,3-diaxial interactions, which usually destabilize the anomer that has the anomeric group in an axial orientation on the ring. This effect is especially noticeable in pyranoses and other six-membered ring compounds. This is a major factor in water.
Hydrogen bonds between the anomeric group and other groups on the ring, leading to stabilization of the anomer.
Dipolar repulsion between the anomeric group and other groups on the ring, leading to destabilization of the anomer.

For D-glucopyranoside, the β-anomer is the more stable anomer in water. For D-mannopyranose, the α-anomer is the more stable anomer.

Because anomers are diastereomers of each other, they often differ in physical and chemical properties. One of the most important physical properties that is used to study anomers is the specific rotation, which can be monitored by polarimetry.

See also 
Monosaccharide nomenclature
Stereochemistry

References

External links

Carbohydrate chemistry
Carbohydrates
Stereochemistry